The 2022 Amputee Football World Cup, aka 2022 Amputee Soccer World Cup, is the 16th/17th edition of the biannual international competition of amputee football national men's teams. It is organized by the World Amputee Football Federation (WAFF), and is held in İstanbul, Turkey  in 30 September–9 October 2022. The previous event took place in Mexico in 2018.

Turkey won the title for the first time, defeating Angola in the final. Uzbekistan became bronze medalist before Haiti.

Participating nations

Group stage 
All times are local, TRT (UTC+03:00)

Tiebreakers
 Total points
 Head to head points
 Head to head goal difference
 Total goal difference
 Total goals scored
 Lowest number of red cards
 Lowest number of yellow cards
 Drawing of lots

Group A

Group B

Group C

Group D

Group E

Group F

Ranking of third-placed teams

Knockout phase

Bracket

Classification play-offs

5-8th place classification

9-16th place classification

17-24th place classification

Rankings

References

Amputee Football World Cup
2022 in disability sport
International association football competitions hosted by Turkey
Amputee Football World Cup
2022–23 in Turkish football
Sport in Istanbul
Parasports in Turkey